Kord Lar is a village in Azadlu Rural District, Muran District, Germi County, Ardabil Province, Iran. At the 2006 census, its population was 511, in 103 families.

References 

Towns and villages in Germi County